Chun Ning "Jeanie" Lau is an American physicist who is a Professor of Quantum Materials at Ohio State University. Her research considers materials for quantum technologies, including Van der Waals materials and superconductors. She was elected a Fellow of the American Physical Society in 2017.

Early life and education 
Lau studied physics at the University of Chicago. She moved to Harvard University for graduate research. After completing her doctorate, Lau joined Hewlett Packard Labs, where she worked as a research associate.

Research and career 
Lau joined the University of California, Riverside as a professor in 2004. Whilst at Riverside, she accidentally realized that when stacking three layers of graphene, depending on how the layers were stacked, the structure would behave either as a conductor or an insulator. She made use of Raman spectroscopy to understand the precise stacking orders, and predicted that enhanced electronic interactions between layers with specific geometries were responsible for the formation of a band gap.

Lai moved to Ohio State University as a professor in 2017. Shestudies how quantum confinement impacts the electronic properties and works on topological superconductors and the fabrication of 2D materials with Moiré patterns.

Awards and honors 
 2008 Presidential Early Career Award for Scientists and Engineers
 2008 National Science Foundation CAREER Award
 2013 Chancellor's Award for Fostering Undergraduate Research and Creative Achievement
 2017 Elected Fellow of the American Physical Society

Selected publications

References 

Year of birth missing (living people)
Living people
American women physicists
21st-century American physicists
21st-century American women scientists
University of Chicago alumni
Harvard University alumni
University of California, Riverside faculty
Ohio State University faculty
Hewlett-Packard people
Fellows of the American Physical Society